The Leyland Hippo was a 6x4 heavy general service cargo truck manufactured by Leyland Motors. Introduced in 1929, it remained in production for 40 years.

Overview
The Leyland Hippo was a 6x4 heavy general service cargo truck introduced by Leyland Motors in 1929. After a number of facelifts, it remained in production for 40 years.

Military use
At the beginning of World War II the British Armed Forces took delivery of 330 militarised Leyland Hippos with open military cabs and bodies, known in service as the Hippo Mk I or the WSW17.  In 1943, as a result of D-Day preparations, Leyland commenced designing an updated version, the Hippo Mk II. Production commenced in 1944 and roughly 1,000 were in service by VE Day. They remained in British service into the 1970s.

Gallery

References

External links

Hippo
Vehicles introduced in 1929